Diego de Pedro Marroquí (born 3 February 2003) is a Spanish professional footballer who plays as a midfielder for FC Cartagena B.

Club career
Born in Almoradí, Alicante, Valencian Community, de Pedro represented CD San Félix and Elche CF as a youth before joining FC Cartagena on 30 June 2021, initially for the Juvenil squad. He made his senior debut with the reserves on 25 September, playing the last 30 minutes of a 4–0 Tercera División RFEF home routing of UD Los Garres.

De Pedro scored his first senior goal on 12 December 2021, netting the opener in a 3–0 away success over Cartagena FC. The following 28 January, he renewed his contract until 2024.

De Pedro made his first team debut on 8 April 2022, coming on as a second-half substitute for Julio Buffarini in a 0–1 away loss against CD Lugo in the Segunda División.

References

External links

2003 births
Living people
People from Vega Baja del Segura
Sportspeople from the Province of Alicante
Footballers from the Valencian Community
Spanish footballers
Association football midfielders
Segunda División players
Tercera Federación players
FC Cartagena B players
FC Cartagena footballers